Prince Moritz of Saxe-Altenburg (24 October 1829 in Eisenberg – 13 May 1907 in Arco, Austria-Hungary), was a member of the ducal house of Saxe-Altenburg. He was the father of Ernst II, Duke of Saxe-Altenburg.

Family
He was the third but second surviving son of Georg, Duke of Saxe-Altenburg and Duchess Marie Louise of Mecklenburg-Schwerin (daughter of Frederick Louis, Hereditary Grand Duke of Mecklenburg-Schwerin and his first wife Grand Duchess Elena Pavlovna of Russia).

Marriage and issue
In Meiningen on 15 October 1862 Moritz married Princess Augusta of Saxe-Meiningen, daughter of Bernhard II, Duke of Saxe-Meiningen. They had five children:

Honours
He received the following orders and decorations:

Moritzstraße in Altenburg is named after the Prince.

Ancestry

References

House of Saxe-Altenburg
1829 births
1907 deaths
People from Saale-Holzland-Kreis
Recipients of the Iron Cross, 2nd class
Generals of Cavalry (Prussia)
Princes of Saxe-Altenburg
Sons of monarchs
Non-inheriting heirs presumptive